One for the Road is the eighth studio album by American rapper Devin the Dude, released on October 15, 2013, by Coughee Brothaz Music and eOne Music. The album was supported by the single "Probably Should Have" released on September 12, 2013. One for the Road was met with positive reviews from music critics, and also debuted at number 36 on the US Billboard Top R&B/Hip-Hop Albums chart.

Background 
In November 2010, Devin the Dude released his seventh studio album Gotta Be Me, under Real Talk Entertainment. In April 2012, Devin the Dude announced that his eighth studio album would be titled One for the Road and announced that it would be released in June 2012. After a year of relative musical silence, on June 24, 2013, Devin the Dude announced, that his eighth studio album would be titled One for the Road and would be released in September 2013.

On September 13, 2013, it was announced that the album would be released on October 8, 2013, via independent powerhouse eOne Music. The same day Devin revealed the cover artwork for the album. The cover art plays on popular cliches, with "Devin sitting at a bar looking like he has already had a couple alcoholic drinks for the road, while being handed a CD which is presumably also for the road." On September 21, 2013, the album was pushed back one week from October 8, 2013, until October 15, 2013.

Release and promotion 
After announcing the album, during April through May 12, 2012 Devin the Dude toured the United States. Devin the Dude then released an EP titled, Seriously Trippin on May 22, 2012, in promotion of his upcoming album. On October 8, 2013, the album was released for free streaming, for a limited time via SoundCloud.

On September 12, 2013, Devin the Dude released the album's first single, "Probably Should Have" which features him reflecting on past relationships that ended bad. The song's smooth production was handled by Thomas Knudsen and Even Brenna. On September 20, 2013, "Probably Should Have" was serviced to urban contemporary radio. The music video was released on October 14, 2013.

Critical reception 

One for the Road was met with generally positive reviews from music critics.  Oscar Pascual of San Francisco Chronicle said, "Devin The Dude has always won us over with his chill beats, effortless flow, and affinity for smoking weed. Not much has changed in his latest album, One For The Road, and that’s a good thing. The disc is packed with smoke-out anthems like "I’m Just Gettin’ Blowed" while also grounding us with life issues like his relationship problems in the song "Probably Should Have". Andrew Gretchko of HipHopDX also gave the album a positive review saying, "While One For The Road’s primarily down-tempo beats help showcase Devin’s latest twist in subject matter, they also put too much of the album’s focus on his lyrics, lacking the kind of complexity (or heavy bass) that would win over some fans before his raps even began. The result is an album filled with the type of laid-back, lackluster production suited for a long drive on the open road."

RAJ of Uproxx's Smoking Section gave the album a positive review saying, "For decades, Devin the Dude’s been hammering out delicious, smokey rhymes to sit back and ride to, and One For The Road doesn’t deviate from the formula. The highs include the weed anthem “I’m Just Getting Blowed,” and continue through the lush lead single, “Probably Should Have,” as Devin woefully laments past relationships gone wrong. However, because of this formula, the album winds up missing any distinctive or unique elements to set it apart from the rest of the Hip-Hop landscape. It ain’t broke, but it's nothing new–for better or worse." Timothy Goldrick of Iowa State Daily said, "production is less than desirable throughout the album. Loud synthesizers overshadow many songs, while others are messy and rushed.
For Devin the Dude’s reincarnation to be as successful as planned, he could have gone with some nice relaxed West-coast beats, but instead he tried to hit the home run. Devin has songs that function well on their own, but the lack of cohesion is still evident."

Track listing

Personnel 
 Credits adapted from AllMusic.

William Beck - Composer
Leroy Bonner - Composer
Even Brenna - Producer
Danielle Brimm - A&R, producer
Garrett Brown - Composer, mixing, producer
Gary Brown - Composer
Joseph "Quest" Chachere - Photography
Chinky P - Producer
Reggie Coby - Composer, producer
Bekah Connolly - A&R
Shawnte Crespo - Product manager
Christian Davis AKA Kidriccc James - Composer
Christopher Deshun - Composer
Devin the Dude - Arranger, engineer, primary artist, producer, composer, executive producer, mixing
Albert "Albie" Dickson - Composer, producer
DNA - Featured artist
Rahsan "Tre" Ellison - Vocals
Charles Fields - Composer
Carlos "DJ Styles" Garza - Producer
Jose Gorbea - Composer, producer
Paul Grosso - Creative Director
Charles "Chuck Heat" Henderson - Producer, composer
Justin Henderson - Composer
Chris Herche - Marketing
James Hoover - Mastering
Kiddrick James - Featured artist
Dexter "Jugg-Mugg" Johnson - Composer, vocals, featured artist
Dow Jones - Producer
Marshall Jones - Composer
Andrew Kelley - Cover design
Thomas Knudsen - Composer, producer
Brendan Laezza - Marketing
Vincent John Martin - Composer
Chad McClain - Assistant
John McDonald - Producer
Robert McQueen III - Composer
Giovanna Melchiorre - Publicity
Ralph Middlebrooks - Composer
Victor Morante - Production director
Alison Moyet - Composer
Odd Squad - Engineer
Marvin Pierce - Composer
Michael Poye - Composer, producer
Rob Quest - Composer, featured artist, producer
Rum - Featured artist
Clarence "Satch" Satchell - Composer
Rodney Spencer - Composer
Corey Sullivan - Composer
Corey "C-Ray" Sullivan - Producer
Hanif Sumner - Publicity
Julia Sutowski - Coordinating producer
Tha Bizness - Producer
Paul Tisdale - Composer
Luster "Tony Mac" Tone - Vocals
Stephan Townsend - Assistant, composer
Shun Ward - Featured artist
Chris Whitacre - Composer
Whiteboy Wagg - Guitar
Angela Williams - Featured artist
Angela Camille Williams - Composer
James Williams - Composer
Oscar Zambrano - Mastering

Chart positions

Release history

References 

2013 albums
Devin the Dude albums
E1 Music albums
Albums produced by Tha Bizness